Edwin Massucco (born 15 July 1999) is a French professional footballer who plays as a midfielder for Jura Sud Foot in the French Championnat National 2.

Club career
Massucco made his senior debut for Football Bourg-en-Bresse Péronnas 01 in a 4–1 Ligue 2 loss to Clermont Foot on 8 September 2017.

In the summer of 2020 he left Bourg-Péronnas for Championnat National 2 side Jura Sud Foot in a bid to relaunch his career, after a serious knee ligament had hampered his progress.

References

External links

Living people
1999 births
Association football midfielders
French footballers
Football Bourg-en-Bresse Péronnas 01 players
Jura Sud Foot players
Ligue 2 players
Championnat National players
Championnat National 2 players
Championnat National 3 players